James David Watkins (born August 26, 1982) is an American track cyclist. At the 2012 Summer Olympics, he competed in the Men's sprint, where he reached the quarterfinals, and sealed a sixth-place ranking in the final classification race.

Personal
Watkins is a firefighter in his hometown of Bakersfield, California. He is married with a daughter.

References

1982 births
Living people
Sportspeople from Bakersfield, California
American track cyclists
American male cyclists
Olympic cyclists of the United States
Cyclists at the 2012 Summer Olympics
Pan American Games silver medalists for the United States
Cyclists at the 2011 Pan American Games
Pan American Games medalists in cycling
Medalists at the 2011 Pan American Games